Man Wanted is a pre-Code 1932 romance film starring Kay Francis as a married magazine editor who hires a handsome secretary, David Manners. The film features Una Merkel and Andy Devine in supporting roles.

Plot
Lois Ames (Kay Francis) is the editor of 400 Magazine, whose wealthy husband, Fred (Kenneth Thomson), pays her little attention. His interests are polo and partying. When her personal secretary, (Elizabeth Patterson), can no longer take the long hours of work and quits, Lois hires Tom Sherman (David Manners), a handsome man who happens to come by the office to demonstrate a rowing machine, as her new secretary.

Tom soon makes himself indispensable to Lois, and their long hours spent together leads them to fall in love with each other. Tom's fiancée, Ruth Holman (Una Merkel), senses something is going on and isn't happy about it. Tom's roommate, Andy Doyle (Andy Devine), uses Tom's absences and Ruth's distress to try to romance Ruth himself. Meanwhile, Lois's husband, Fred, is having an affair with Anna Le Maire (Claire Dodd). Lois finds out when she discovers a key to Anna's room in Fred's vest pocket, which she puts on Fred's pillow; nothing is said between them, but Fred now knows that Lois knows about his infidelity.

After things go too far between Tom and Lois, Tom quits and begins to plan a wedding with Ruth. Lois tries to smooth things over with Fred, but instead they agree on an amicable divorce. On Tom's last day of work, Lois keeps him busy until very late, and he misses a dinner engagement with Ruth and Andy. Ruth storms into the office, with Andy in tow, and threatens to tell Fred about the affair. Lois tells everyone about the divorce, Ruth breaks her engagement with Tom and threatens to marry Andy in revenge, and Tom asks Lois to marry him.

Cast

 Kay Francis as Lois Ames
 David Manners as Thomas Sherman
 Una Merkel as Ruth Holman
 Andy Devine as Andy Doyle
 Kenneth Thomson as Fred Ames

 Claire Dodd as Ann Le Maire
 Elizabeth Patterson as Miss Harper
 Edward Van Sloan as Mr. Walters
 Frank Coghlan, Jr. as youngster in store

Cast notes:
Man Wanted was the first film that Kay Francis made for Warner Bros., beginning her contract run with the studio.

Production
Man Wanted had several working titles before it was released: "A Dangerous Brunette", "Working Wives" and "Pleasure First". The film was produced before the advent of the Production Code, and its themes of adultery would never have survived Joseph I. Breen's blue pencil.

References

External links
 
 
 
 

1932 films
American black-and-white films
Films directed by William Dieterle
1930s romantic comedy-drama films
American romantic comedy-drama films
1932 comedy films
1932 drama films
1930s American films
Films scored by Bernhard Kaun